Thérèse Desqueyroux is a 2012 French drama film directed by Claude Miller, based on the 1927 novel of the same name by François Mauriac. The film stars Audrey Tautou and Gilles Lellouche. It closed the 2012 Cannes Film Festival, where it was screened out of competition.

Plot

In the south-west of France, in the late 1920s, Thérèse Laroque agrees to a marriage of convenience between wealthy families by marrying  Bernard Desqueyroux, a bourgeois landowner. They then settle on his family's property, located in a vast area stretching over acres of pine forests. Bernard is a local man with a passion for hunting and defending with conviction the family traditions. However, Thérèse is quickly stifled by the monotony of her married life. She gives birth to a daughter (Marie), but her boredom seems to grow every day; she is looking "somewhere else". Bernard suffers from an unspecified condition for which he is prescribed arsenic. Thérèse takes the opportunity to attempt to poison her husband, but in forging a prescription, she is discovered. In addition to being dishonored by her own family, she is disowned by her husband's. She faces justice for the alleged murder attempt until her husband and in-laws, who intend to keep up appearances within their provincial society, make up their own version of what happened. The case is dismissed and Therese is confined to the house. Eventually she is allowed to leave and live in Paris on the understanding that she will only return for weddings and funerals.

Cast
 Audrey Tautou as Thérèse Desqueyroux
 Gilles Lellouche as Bernard Desqueyroux
 Anaïs Demoustier as Anne de la Trave
 Catherine Arditi as Madame de la Trave
 Isabelle Sadoyan as Aunt Clara
 Stanley Weber as Jean Azevedo 
 Francis Perrin as Monsieur Larroque 
 Yves Jacques as Lawyer
 Alba Gaïa Kraghede Bellugi as Therese Larroque

References

External links
 

2012 films
2012 drama films
2010s French-language films
Films based on French novels
Films directed by Claude Miller
Films set in the 1920s
Films set in France
Films shot in France
France 3 Cinéma films
French drama films
2010s French films